Greg McAdoo is a general partner at Bolt.io in Silicon Valley since 2017. Prior to joining Bolt.io, Greg spent 12 years as a senior partner at Sequoia Capital.  Greg specializes in internet services, mobile, energy and technology investments. Greg at some time was on the boards of Airbnb, Bump Technologies, Cue, Clustrix, Imageshack, MeLLmo and Songkick. Greg also led Sequoia's investment in Y Combinator and previously sat on the boards of Isilon Systems, Loopt, RockYou, Achates Power and  PowerFile.

Prior to joining Sequoia Capital in 2000, McAdoo was the president and CEO of Sentient Networks (CSCO).

Outside of entrepreneurial endeavors and investing, he was on the board of directors of the National Air and Space Museum of the Smithsonian Institution.

References

External links
 Y Combinator Gets the Sequoia Capital Seal of Approval
 Greg McAdoo at Startup School 2008

American venture capitalists
Living people
Year of birth missing (living people)